Mehdi Abeid (born 6 August 1992) is a professional footballer who plays as a midfielder for UAE Pro League club Khor Fakkan and the Algeria national team.

Early life
Abeid was born in Montreuil, Seine-Saint-Denis, France, to Algerian parents from Aïn Témouchent, Algeria.

Club career

Lens
Abeid joined RC Lens in 2003 and was part of the academy team for eight years before he left to join Newcastle United.

Newcastle United
Abeid joined Newcastle United on 25 May 2011, signing a five-year contract. Following his transfer, he stated:

 "After eight fantastic years at Lens, I have stagnated. I needed a change of air. I am not afraid to leave for abroad, I have had contact dating back some time and I visited the facilities there last week. I even trained with the reserve team. The leaders of the club told me about their plans and that they will rely on me for next season. For my part, I intend to give everything to develop in the Premier League. I already discussed things with Cheick Tioté and they encouraged me and welcomed my signature".

Abeid made his debut for Newcastle United in a pre-season friendly against Darlington, which was followed by a pitch invasion, which caused the game to be delayed for ten minutes. On 20 September 2011, Abeid made his official debut for the club as a starter against Nottingham Forest in the third round of the 2011–12 Football League Cup. He scored his first goal in a 1–1 draw against Turkish side Fenerbahçe on 21 July 2012.

Loan to St Johnstone
On 31 January 2013, Abeid went on loan to Scottish Premier League side St Johnstone until the end of the season.

Loan to Panathinaikos
On 30 July 2013, Abeid signed a one-year loan deal with Panathinaikos. He scored his first goal in a match against Veria. He went on to help his team achieve third place, three points behind runners-up PAOK. He contributed with seven goals and five assists in 28 appearances, being the team's second-highest goalscorer of the season. On 26 April 2014, he helped Panathinaikos win the Greek Cup, their first since 2010. He then helped his team win the Greek play-offs for the Champions League by scoring two goals in four games.

Return to Newcastle United
On 1 November 2014, three years after he signed for the club, Abeid made his Premier League debut for Newcastle United, playing the full 90 minutes in a 1–0 home win over Liverpool. He suffered a fractured toe while on international duty with Algeria in mid-November.

Panathinaikos
On 18 August 2015, Abeid joined Panathinaikos for an undisclosed fee. His excellent performance during the season was a passport to be called up in Algeria squad ahead of African Cup qualifiers against Ethiopia on 25 and 29 March 2016.

Dijon

On 30 August 2016, the second spell of Abeid with Panathinaikos was officially terminated, since the Algerian international central midfielder joined Dijon FCO. The 24-year-old former player of Newcastle United, who failed to repeat the impressive performances of 2013–14 season after his return to the Greens at summer of 2015 and was not in manager Andrea Stramaccioni's plans, signed a three-season contract with the french club, while Panathinaikos kept a percentage of his rights, in order to make some profit in case of a future transfer.

Nantes
In July 2019, Abeid joined Dijon's Ligue 1 rivals FC Nantes on a free transfer following the expiration of his Dijon contract. He reportedly agreed a three-year deal with Nantes.

Al-Nasr
In late January 2021, Abeid joined UAE Pro League club Al-Nasr for a fee of £1.35m.

International career
In 2009, Abeid was a member of the France national under-17 team at the 2009 UEFA European Under-17 Championship in Germany. He played in all three of France's group games, starting two of them. He has also been capped at under-16 and under-18 level.

In September 2011, Abeid said that he was considering an offer to switch allegiance and represent Algeria at under-23 level. On 30 September, sports daily Le Buteur announced that Abeid had spoken to Algeria's under-23 coach Azzedine Aït Djoudi and confirmed that he would be joining the team for a training camp in October. On 8 October, he started for the team in a friendly against USM Alger. On 13 November, he made his official debut as a starter in a 2–0 win against South Africa. On 16 November, he was selected as part of Algeria's squad for the 2011 CAF U-23 Championship in Morocco.

In November 2014, Abeid received his first international call-up to the senior team for the 2015 Africa Cup of Nations qualifiers against Ethiopia and Mali. A fractured toe ruled him out of selection for both games. In June 2015, he made his full international debut, coming on as a substitute for the last 5 minutes of a 2017 Africa Cup of Nations qualifier against Seychelles.

Career statistics

Club

International

Scores and results list Algeria's goal tally first, score column indicates score after each Abeid goal.

Honours
Panathinaikos
Greek Cup: 2014

Algeria
Africa Cup of Nations: 2019

References

External links

Profile at the official Newcastle United website

Living people
1992 births
Sportspeople from Montreuil, Seine-Saint-Denis
Algerian footballers
Algeria under-23 international footballers
Algeria international footballers
French footballers
France youth international footballers
Association football midfielders
Newcastle United F.C. players
St Johnstone F.C. players
Panathinaikos F.C. players
Dijon FCO players
FC Nantes players
Al-Nasr SC (Dubai) players
Khor Fakkan Sports Club players
Championnat National 2 players
Scottish Premier League players
Super League Greece players
Premier League players
Ligue 1 players
UAE Pro League players
2011 CAF U-23 Championship players
2017 Africa Cup of Nations players
2019 Africa Cup of Nations players
Algerian expatriate footballers
French expatriate footballers
Expatriate footballers in England
Expatriate footballers in Greece
Expatriate footballers in Scotland
Expatriate footballers in the United Arab Emirates
Algerian expatriate sportspeople in England
Algerian expatriate sportspeople in Greece
Algerian expatriate sportspeople in Scotland
Algerian expatriate sportspeople in the United Arab Emirates
French expatriate sportspeople in England
French expatriate sportspeople in Greece
French expatriate sportspeople in Scotland
French expatriate sportspeople in the United Arab Emirates
French sportspeople of Algerian descent
Footballers from Seine-Saint-Denis